Marjorie Pollitt, born Marjorie Brewer (1902–1991) was a British teacher and communist activist.

Marjorie Brewer was a founder member of the Communist Party of Great Britain (CPGB) in 1920. In 1925 she married Harry Pollitt. During the 1926 General Strike she was arrested and charged with sedition for distributing The Workers Bulletin, a Communist newsletter. Fined £50, she was dismissed from her teaching post, and risked having her teaching certificate suspended.

In the 1950 general election she unsuccessfully contested Hendon North for the Communist Party.

Works
 Defeat of Trotskyism. London: Communist Party of Great Britain, 1937.
 A Rebel Life: Marjorie Pollitt recalls her life and times. Ultimo: Red Pen Publications, 1989. With an introduction by Laurie Aarons.

References

External links
 Marjorie Pollitt Archive

1902 births
1991 deaths
Communist Party of Great Britain members
British schoolteachers